The 2019–20 season was Norwich City's first season back in the Premier League after winning the EFL Championship last season. This season, they participated in the Premier League, FA Cup and EFL Cup. The season covered the period from 1 July 2019 to 26 July 2020.

Norwich finished 20th (last position) and became the first team to suffer a fifth relegation from the Premier League.

Transfers

Transfers in

Loans in

Loans out

Transfers out

Pre-season friendlies

Competitions

Overview

Premier League

League table

Results summary

Results by matchday

Matches
On 13 June 2019, the Premier League fixtures were announced.

FA Cup

The third round draw was made live on BBC Two from Etihad Stadium, Micah Richards and Tony Adams conducted the draw. The fourth round draw was made by Alex Scott and David O'Leary on Monday, 6 January. The draw for the fifth round was made on 27 January 2020, live on The One Show.

EFL Cup

The second round draw was made on 13 August 2019 following the conclusion of all but one first round matches.

Statistics

Appearances, goals and cards

Goalscorers

References

Norwich City F.C. seasons
Norwich City